Mount Howard may refer to the following mountains:

 Mount Howard (Alberta) (2777 m), in the Canadian Rockies 
 Mount Howard (Antarctica) (1460 m), in the Prince Albert Mountains
 Mount Howard (British Columbia) (2551 m), in the Coast Mountains
 Mount Howard (Oregon) (2516 m), in the Wallowa Mountains
 Mount Howard (Washington) (2153 m), in the North Cascades